This is the list of the number ones on the UK Independent Singles Breakers Chart during the 2000s.

Number ones

Notes

References

External links
Independent Singles Breakers at the Official Charts Company

Indie Breakers 2000s
2000s in British music
United Kingdom Indie Breakers